Flames is a 1917 British silent drama film directed by Maurice Elvey and starring Margaret Bannerman, Owen Nares and Edward O'Neill. It is based on an 1897 novel by Robert Hichens. It follows the experiments of a strange occultist.

Cast
 Margaret Bannerman - Cuckoo
 Owen Nares - Valentine Creswell
 Edward O'Neill - Richard Marr
 Douglas Munro - Doctor Levetier
 Clifford Cobbe - Julian Addison

References

External links

1917 films
1910s fantasy drama films
British silent feature films
British black-and-white films
1910s English-language films
Films directed by Maurice Elvey
Films based on British novels
British fantasy drama films
1917 drama films
1910s British films
Silent drama films